"Libre" ("Free") is a song by José Luis Armenteros and Pablo Herrero, first performed and made popular by Spanish pop star Nino Bravo on his 1972 album of the same name. The song's lyrics tell of a young man  who is "tired of dreaming" and yearns to fly "free like a bird that escaped its prison."

Contrary to popular belief, it was not inspired by the death of Peter Fechter, who was killed while trying to cross the Berlin Wall in 1962. According to Pablo Herrero, one of the composers, it was inspired by the yearning for freedom during the dictatorship of Francisco Franco in Spain. However, Herrero recounts that when he heard the story of Peter Fechter, he was astonished at how precisely it was mirrored in the song.

A hit in Spain, it managed to climb the charts without being bothered by censorship because radio presenters circulated the Peter Fechter interpretation. In this way, the song’s criticism of Francoism was ruled out and a certain affinity was projected between its message and the anti-communist ideology of the Spanish regime.

The song also became popular in much of Spanish-speaking Latin America, where it took on political overtones. Banned in Cuba, in Chile it was adopted as an anti-communist anthem and became popular among supporters of the military junta. The dictatorship that ensued later “appropriated” the song. As such it was performed in 1974 during the first post-coup edition of the Viña del Mar International Song Festival by Edmundo Arrocet while Augusto Pinochet was in the public. In 1976 the song was again performed at the Viña del Mar International Song Festival while Pinochet was in the public. That time it was Juan Bau who sang it.

It was one of various songs reported to have been played as a backdrop during the torture of political prisoners during the Augusto Pinochet dictatorship.

References

External links
 
 
 

1972 songs
Nino Bravo songs
Protest songs